Niamh Rose McCormack (born 17 January 2001) is an Irish actress and model.

Early life and education
McCormack is the daughter of makeup artist Annie Gribbin and publican Paddy McCormack. Her parents separated when she was an infant, and she was predominantly raised by her mother while visiting her father on weekends. McCormack left school at 14 to be homeschooled due to bullying and completed her Leaving Cert at a private college. She trained in acting at Bow Street Academy, graduating in 2019.

Career
Signed with Morgan the Agency, McCormack began her modeling career when she was 14, with gigs for The Bridge, Arnotts and Life Style Sports. She participated in Milan Fashion Week at 16.

On 8 December 2020, it was reported that McCormack would appear in the second season of Netflix adaption of Andrzej Sapkowski's The Witcher as the mysterious W. She reprised her role as Róisín from the 2016 short film Lily in its 2021 feature version Who We Love. She has upcoming roles in the film The Magic Flute, the Disney+ series Willow, and the Netflix series The F**k It Bucket.

Filmography

Film

Television

Music videos
 "Everything You Love" (2020), Ring Saigo

References

External links 

Living people
2001 births
21st-century Irish actresses
Actresses from County Dublin
Alumni of the Bow Street Academy
Child models
Irish female models
Irish television actresses